Flavin may refer to:

Science
 Flavin adenine dinucleotide (FAD), a redox cofactor
 Flavin-containing amine oxidoreductase, a family of amine oxidases
 Flavin-containing monooxygenase (FMO), a protein family
 Flavin containing monooxygenase 1, a human gene
 Flavin containing monooxygenase 3, a human gene
 Flavin group, a group of organic compounds
 Flavin mononucleotide, a biomolecule produced from riboflavin
 Flavin reductase, an enzyme

Places
 Flavin, Aveyron, a commune in southern France

People
 Adrian Flavin (born 1979), a professional rugby player
 Christopher Flavin, president of the Worldwatch Institute
 Dan Flavin (1933–1996),  a minimalist artist famous for using fluorescent light fixtures
 Dan Flavin (politician), Louisiana politician
 Dick Flavin (Gaelic footballer) (born 1978), Irish Gaelic football player
 Dick Flavin (poet) (1936–2022), American poet
 James Flavin (1906–1976), an American character actor
 Jennifer Flavin (born 1968), a former model and  wife of actor Sylvester Stallone
 Martin Flavin (1883–1967), an American playwright and novelist
 Martin Flavin (politician) (1841–1917), Irish Nationalist politician, Member of Parliament (MP) for Cork, 1891–1892
 Michael Joseph Flavin (1866-1944), Irish Nationalist politician, Member of Parliament (MP) for North Kerry, 1896-1918
 Mick Flavin, an Irish country singer